Bandon (sometimes called Bandon Bridge or Bandonbridge) was a Parliamentary constituency covering the town of Bandon in County Cork, Ireland. From 1801 to 1885 it elected one Member of Parliament (MP) to the House of Commons of the United Kingdom of Great Britain and Ireland.

Bandon was a borough constituency with two representatives in the Irish House of Commons before 1801. The area retained one member after the Act of Union, until the borough was disenfranchised in 1885.

Boundaries
This constituency was the parliamentary borough of Bandon, County Cork.

The exact definition contained in the Parliamentary Boundaries (Ireland) Act 1832 was:

History

Local government
The borough, which existed as a local government unit until it was abolished by the Municipal Corporations (Ireland) Act 1840, had an oligarchic constitution.

The corporation of the borough was formally known as "The Provost, Free Burgesses, and Commonalty of the Borough of Bandon-Bridge" and consisted of a provost, 12 burgesses, and an unlimited number of freemen. The common council, a body not mentioned in the borough charter, was constituted by a by-law of the corporation made in 1621. It consisted of twelve members, who were elected from the freemen by the corporation at large, as vacancies arose. The burgesses were chosen from the common council, on vacancies occurring, by the provost and burgesses.

The provost was elected annually from and by the burgesses at midsummer, and took office at Michaelmas. The freedom was acquired by birth for the eldest son of a freeman, and nomination of the provost, who during the year of his office had the privilege of naming one. The freemen were elected by a majority of the body at large assembled in a court of D'Oyer Hundred; neither residence nor any other qualification was considered necessary.

Parliamentary constituency
Before 1832 the Parliamentary franchise for this constituency was extremely restricted. Only the provost (who was the returning officer for the borough) and the twelve burgesses were enfranchised. The population of the town, in 1821, was 10,179. All the elections in this period were unopposed returns; except for one election in 1831, where only ten voters participated and eleven votes were cast (including the returning officer's casting vote).

Stooks Smith gives an account of this contested election. It was the second by-election of 1831. As his book is out of copyright, the whole passage is set out below.

The franchise was expanded in 1832 because of the Great Reform Act, when the £10 householders were added to the electorate and the registration of voters was introduced. In the election later that year, there were 266 registered electors in Bandon and 233 votes were cast in the general election. It appears, from the list of MPs and the report of the 1831 election, that the choice of the borough electorate both before and after 1832 was influenced by aristocratic patrons like the Duke of Devonshire and the Bernard family (whose head had the title of Earl of Bandon). If a Bernard was not elected then quite prominent political figures, notably the future Whig leaders George Tierney and Lord John Russell, were sometimes returned for the borough.

In 1868 the incumbent Bernard MP was defeated by William Shaw, standing in the Liberal interest. Later in his career Shaw was an associate of Isaac Butt in the Home Rule League. After Butt's death in 1879, Shaw became the parliamentary leader of Irish Nationalism until he was replaced by Charles Stewart Parnell in 1880.

The constituency was disenfranchised in 1885. The area was then represented in Parliament as part of South East Cork, one of seven constituencies created from the partition of County Cork constituency.

Members of Parliament

Elections

Elections in the 1880s

 Caused by Bernard's resignation.

Elections in the 1870s

Elections in the 1860s

 Caused by Bernard's death

Elections in the 1850s

 Caused by Bernard's succession to the peerage, becoming 3rd Earl of Bandon

Elections in the 1840s

 Caused by Jackson's appointment as Solicitor-General for Ireland

Elections in the 1830s

 Note [1831 (July)]: By-election caused by Bernard's resignation. Clifford was elected on the Returning Officer's casting vote. The Returning Officer John Swete was also Provost and had already cast one of the four votes for Clifford, so this was actually his second vote.

 Caused by Bernard's succession to the peerage, becoming 2nd Earl of Bandon

References

External links
Part of the Library Ireland: Irish History and Culture website containing the text of A Topographical Directory of Ireland, by Samuel Lewis (a work published by S. Lewis & Co of London in 1837) including an article on Bandon

Sources 
The Parliaments of England by Henry Stooks Smith (1st edition published in three volumes 1844–50), 2nd edition edited (in one volume) by F.W.S. Craig (Political Reference Publications 1973)

Westminster constituencies in County Cork (historic)
Constituencies of the Parliament of the United Kingdom established in 1801
Constituencies of the Parliament of the United Kingdom disestablished in 1885
Bandon, County Cork